Burgersfort is located in the valley of the Spekboom River at the edge of the Bushveld Complex in the Fetakgomo Tubatse Local Municipality, near the border of the two provinces Limpopo and Mpumalanga. The town was named after a hexagonal fort built there during the 1876-77 Second War against the Bapedi of Chief Sekhukhune, and was named after President TF Burgers of the ZAR. The town serves as a meeting point for two major roads, the R37 and R555. The region is rich in platinum and platinum group metals.  The town's neighbouring towns are Mashishing (60 km), Steelpoort (16 km) and Ohrigstad (26 km).

References

External links 

Populated places in the Fetakgomo Tubatse Local Municipality